Zoch is a German surname. Notable people with the surname include:

Georg Zoch (1902–1944), German screenwriter and film director
Hieronim Zoch (born 1990), Polish footballer
Jackie Zoch (born 1949), American rower
Matheo Zoch (born 1996), Bolivian footballer

German-language surnames